Stanley Osaretin Okoro  (born 8 December 1992) is a Nigerian footballer who plays as a winger or forward.

Career
Born in Enugu, Okoro finished his graduation with Heartland FC, after spells with River Lane FC and National Grammar School. He made his senior debuts with the former in 2009.

On 14 April 2010, Okoro joined UD Almeria in Spain, signing a four-year contract. He was initially assigned to the Juvenil squad, being promoted to the reserves in the following year.

In July 2013, Okoro moved to Bulgarian A Professional Football Group side Cherno More Varna in a season-long loan deal. He played his first match as a professional on 3 August, starting in a 0–0 draw at CSKA Sofia, and scored his first goal on 11 December, netting the first of a 2–0 win at Lokomotiv Sofia.

On 29 May 2014, Okoro was promoted to the Andalusians' main squad for the pre-season, but returned to the B-side in August. Released in the summer of 2015, he returned to his nation in 2016, signing for Abia Warriors FC.

On 7 May 2017, Okoro joined fellow Nigerian Professional Football League side Plateau United FC, but was released on 28 September.

International career
Okoro appeared with the under-17 team at the 2009 FIFA U-17 World Cup, playing his first match in the tournament in a 3–3 draw against Germany and scoring his side's first goal through a penalty kick in the 54th minute. He subsequently scored against New Zealand and Spain, and was a starter in the eventual 0–1 final loss to Switzerland.

On 29 August 2010, Okoro was called up to the main squad, replacing injured Joseph Akpala for a 2012 Africa Cup of Nations qualification match against Madagascar. He made his debut on 5 September, coming on as a second-half substitute for Michael Eneramo in a 2–0 win at the U. J. Esuene Stadium.

Personal life
Okoro's older brothers, Osas and Charles, are also footballers.

References

External links

1992 births
Living people
Footballers from Enugu
Nigerian footballers
Association football wingers
Association football forwards
Heartland F.C. players
Plateau United F.C. players
Segunda División B players
UD Almería B players
First Professional Football League (Bulgaria) players
PFC Cherno More Varna players
Nigerian expatriate footballers
Nigerian expatriate sportspeople in Bulgaria
Expatriate footballers in Bulgaria
Nigerian expatriate sportspeople in Spain
Expatriate footballers in Spain
Nigeria international footballers
Abia Warriors F.C. players